Being lovestruck means having mental and physical symptoms associated with falling in love: "Love-struck ... means to be hit by love ... you are hit in your heart by the emotion of love".

While being lovestruck has historically been viewed as a short-lived mental illness brought on by the intense changes associated with romantic love, this view has been out of favor since the humoral model was abandoned, and since the advent of modern scientific psychiatry.

Metaphors
The concept is associated with a set of metaphors attempting to convey the speed and intensity of falling in love by describing it as a physical process of falling or being struck.

Alternately, falling in love is often described with reference to Cupid's arrow. Other sources, such as Tristram Shandy, describe the process by referring to it as the act of being shot with a gun: "I am in love with Mrs Wadman, quoth my uncle Toby She has left a ball here added my uncle Toby pointing to his breast".

Psychoanalysis

The twentieth-century saw the concept of love-sickness reconceptualised by psychoanalysis. As early as 1915, Freud asked rhetorically, "Isn't what we mean by 'falling in love' a kind of sickness and craziness, an illusion, a blindness to what the loved person is really like?" Half a century later, in 1971, Hans Loewald took up the theme, comparing being in analysis "to the passions and conflicts stirred up anew in the state of being in love which, from the point of view of the ordinary order and emotional tenor and discipline of life, feels like an illness, with all its deliciousness and pain".

Symptoms

A 2005 article by Frank Tallis suggested that being utterly romantically lovestruck should be taken more seriously by professionals.

"For love-struck victims, the world appears altered. Replacing the flatness of ordinary experience is a fullness".

According to Tallis, some of the symptom clusters shared with being lovestruck include:
 Euphoria, that is, abnormally elevated mood, inflated self-esteem, extravagant gift giving
 Tearfulness
 Loss of concentration and difficulty sleeping
 Lack of appetite
 Stress high blood pressure, pain in chest and heart, acute insomnia; sometimes brought on by a "crush"
 Obsessive–compulsive disorder Preoccupation and hoarding valueless but superstitiously resonant items
 Psychologically created physical symptoms, such as upset stomach, change in appetite, insomnia, dizziness, and confusion.

More substantively, the estimated serotonin levels of people falling in love were observed to drop to levels found in patients with OCD. Brain-scan investigations of individuals who professed to be "truly, madly, deeply" in love showed activity in several structures in common with the neuroanatomy of obsessive–compulsive disorder (OCD), for example, the anterior cingulate cortex and caudate nucleus.

Criticism

Some who would "disagree with Frank Tallis's fundamental thesis that love should be seen as a mental illness ... concur that at the extreme and under certain circumstances love sickness can drive a person to despair".

They would suggest however that "'disordered love' ... can be understood more clearly in terms of attachment theory".

Literary examples

 The character of Romeo fits the archetype of a lovestruck youth that he has become the very model of Cupid himself.
 In Possession, the hero's ex quotes Robert Graves to her new lover: "Oh Love, be fed by apples while you may", echoing the Song of Solomon: "comfort me with apples: for I am sick of love".

See also

References

Further reading

 Frank Tallis, Love Sick: Love as a Mental Illness (2005)

Anxiety disorders
Emotion
Emotional issues
Love
Psychodynamics